Sold is a British comedy drama television series produced by Touchpaper Television for ITV. The series stars Kris Marshall and Bryan Dick as Matt and Danny, employees of Colubrines Estate Agents. It is written by Steve Coombes and was broadcast between 15 November and 20 December 2007.

Characters 
 Danny, played by Bryan Dick — An estate agent "with a heart ... who makes [buyers' and sellers'] dreams come true."
 Matt, played by Kris Marshall — Danny's colleague, who seeks to exploit people for their money.
 Mr. Colubrine, played by Anthony Head — The owner of the company. Head bases his performance on Alan Sugar.
 Mel, played by Christina Cole
 Phoebe, played by Ella Smith
 Jonty, played by Dan Johnston

Production 
Filming began in the week beginning 25 June 2007 in and around London.  It is directed by Cilla Ware and distributed internationally by RDF Media. Prior to the announcement of the series, it was referred to by RDF as "Homeboys". The set for the estate Agents was The Pub Studio in Battersea London.

Episodes

Reception 
The programme opened with strong ratings, securing 4 million viewers for the first and second episodes. That number had halved by the final episode. Writing in The Guardian, Gareth McLean called it "so atrocious in every possible way – from its dire script through cartoonish characters to music that will have you hankering for tinnitus".

References

External links 

Sold at Touchpaper Television

2007 British television series debuts
2007 British television series endings
2000s British comedy-drama television series
ITV comedy
ITV television dramas
Television series by Banijay